Frank Augusto Ramírez Mateus (12 February 1939 – 19 February 2015) was a Colombian actor and television director, playing roles in various series, both American and Colombian.

Biography
Ramírez was the son of Jorge Ismael Ramírez Rojas, pharmacist and member of the Colombian Liberal Party, and Cecilia Mateus Rico. Ramírez studied at the Escuela Nacional de Arte Dramático in Bogotá, but left for the United States in 1964, studying under Actors Studio tutelage. While in the U.S., he took on roles in series such as Barnaby Jones, Lou Grant, and The Flying Nun.

After returning to Colombia, he appeared in the films Cóndores no entierran todos los días (1984), La estrategia del caracol (1993), and the telenovela La Saga, Negocio de Familia (2004). Ramírez's last role was the Colombian version of Héctor Salamanca in Metástasis, a Spanish-language remake of Breaking Bad. He died at age 76, at Clínica Marly, of Parkinson's disease, in 2015.

Filmography
A partial filmography follows.

Television 
 The Flying Nun (1968) "The Crooked Convent" (S2E2)
 Gunsmoke (1973) "Whelan's Men" (S18E20) as Breed
 Cóndores no entierran todos los días (1984)
 La estrategia del caracol (1993)
  Pecados Capitales (2003)
 La Saga, Negocio de Familia (2004)
 En los tacones de Eva (2006) as Jesús Mejía
 Metástasis (2014) as Héctor Salamanca

Film 

 The Sacketts (1979)
 A Man of Principle (1984)
 Técnicas de duelo (1988)
 Miracle in Rome (1988)
 María Cano (1990)
 Río Negro (1991)
 The Strategy of the Snail (1993)
 Águilas no cazan moscas (1994)

References

External links

2015 deaths
People from Casanare Department
Colombian male film actors
Colombian male telenovela actors
Colombian male television actors
Deaths from Parkinson's disease
Neurological disease deaths in Colombia
1939 births